Salesia may refer to:

 a Hystrignathidae
 incorrect form of Salesian